The 2018 European BMX Championships were held in Glasgow, United Kingdom, on 10 and 11 August 2018. The championships are part of the first European Championships with other six sports events happening in Glasgow and Berlin.

In 2018, for the first time, the European championships of four cycling events (Road, Track, BMX and Mountain bike) were held in a single period and a single venue, and the events were part of the program of the first edition of the European Championships.

Events

Medal table

See also
 2018 European Cycling Championships

References

External links

Union Européenne de Cyclisme official web site

European BMX Championships
BMX
European BMX Championships
International sports competitions in Glasgow
BMX
Euro